Sleep deprivation - the condition of not having enough sleep - is a common health issue for students in higher education. This issue has several underlying and negative consequences, but there are a few helpful improvements that students can make to reduce its frequency and severity. 

On average, university students get 6 to 6.9 hours of sleep every night. Based on the Treatment for Sleep Disorders, the recommended amount of sleep needed for college students is around 8 hours. According to Stanford University's Department for the Diagnosis, 68% of college students aren't getting the sleep they need. The main causes of sleep deprivation include poor sleep hygiene, biology, use of technology, and use of drugs. The effects can damage the student’s GPA, as well as negatively affect the student's focus and memory. Furthermore, the effects on the individual’s mental health can be harmful too. Students may face depression, anxiety, and difficulty maintaining their relationships. There are many possible solutions to combat sleep deprivation including improving bedroom environment, reducing exposure to blue light, and taking naps during the day.

Background 
Sleepiness is known as the struggle to stay awake and remain alert during the day and results in drowsiness or unintended sleep. Additionally, the term sleep deprivation can be defined as having a lack of sleep that does not support daytime awareness. In most literature, sleep deprivation is also noted as acute sleep deprivation or chronic partial sleep deprivation. Chronic partial sleep deprivation is sleep deprivation caused when students obtain some but not adequate sleep. Acute sleep deprivation is more widely known as the situation in which one is awake for 24 hours or longer.

From student reports, 70.65% of students are sleep deprived and 50% of college students exhibit daytime sleepiness. Additionally, only 4% of students obtain 7 hours of sleep or more. The average was 5.7 hours of sleep and students on average pull 2.7 “all-nighters” per month. Note that “all-nighters” is the term used when one does not sleep throughout the entire night.

Causes

Sleep hygiene 
Inadequate sleep hygiene is one reason why college students experience sleep deprivation. Sleep hygiene is defined as habits or practices that allow for healthy amounts of sleep on a daily basis. Good sleep hygiene habits include keeping a consistent sleep schedule, having a quiet sleep environment, avoiding the consumption of caffeine after lunch, and minimizing alcohol consumption before bed.

Technology 
Using technology before falling asleep can affect a student’s sleep pattern. The blue light that is emitted from the screens of cell phones, computers, and other devices stops the production of melatonin. Melatonin is a hormone that controls the sleep-wake cycle of the circadian rhythm. This reduction of the amount of melatonin produced makes it harder to fall and stay asleep. The National Sleep Foundation conducted a poll in 2011 and reported that approximately 90% of Americans used technology in the hour before bed. The poll noted that young adults and teenagers were more likely to use cell phones, computers, and video game consoles than other adults. Furthermore, 22% of participants reported going to sleep with cell phone ringers on in their bedroom and 10% reported awakenings in at least a few nights per week due to their cell phones' ringers. Among those with the cell phone ringers on, being awakened by their cell phone was correlated to difficulty sustaining sleep.

According to Elizabeth B. Dowdell and Brianne Q. Clayton, sleep-deprived college students performed significantly worse than peers who had adequate sleep on cognitive skills. Furthermore, the sleep-deprived students were not aware of the extent to which sleep deprivation negatively affects their ability to complete cognitive tasks. Research has shown that individuals with excessive technology use in the bedroom have later bedtimes and tend to sleep later in the morning. The reliance on technology in the bedroom, which should be associated only with sleep, creates difficulty separating waking and sleeping activities. When measuring the amount of sleep during the week compared to the weekend, students with four or more technological devices in their bedroom had significantly less sleep compared to those with three or fewer devices. Since many students do not utilize a do not disturb mode or silence their phones at night, each notification and alert from their phones disrupts their sleep in terms of quality and duration.

Circadian rhythm 
Several recent studies have shown that adolescents undergo a change in their circadian rhythm which shifts sleep times later into the night. This change seems to occur during puberty, extending well into adulthood. The delay in sleep cycles clashes with the structured early morning schedules of students due to early classes or work; thus, the total amount of sleep time is greatly reduced. There has been a push in many educational systems for a later start time to help increase the available time for sleep in adolescents due to these biological changes.

Scheduling 
Many college students have variable day-to-day class schedules that change one's daily schedule. Additionally, many college campuses offer late night social activities that can begin as late as 10pm. These activities are crucial for college students because they allow socialization and bonding with one another, which may boost one's mood. Similarly, many fraternity and sorority organizations on college campuses hold events and fundraisers that often occur late and throughout the night which are mandatory obligations for some. Having to work an event in the middle of the night can cause someone's sleep schedule to be disrupted for the entire day and possibly the next day.

Stimulants 
Stimulants increase the time it takes to fall asleep as well as suppress REM (rapid eye movement) sleep states. Those who use stimulants report worse sleep qualities. Through a study conducted within 119 colleges and universities across the US, 6.9% of stimulants used present a lifetime prevalence for students. Men are more likely to use stimulants, caffeine, and energy drinks. Non-prescribed use of stimulants can increase the use of alcohol, cocaine, and marijuana.

Caffeine 
A study from the University of Kentucky depicted that more than 78% of college freshmen consume above the recommended amount of caffeine each day. In a study from the Henry Ford Hospital's Sleep and Research Center and Wayne State College of Medicine, they discovered that caffeine consumed within six hours of bedtime can significantly disrupt sleep. Participants in this study who consumed caffeine right before bedtime, three hours before bedtime, and six hours before bedtime all experienced a shorter night's sleep, lower sleep quality, and spent more time awake at night.

College students drink coffee as their source of caffeine. 2-4 cups of coffee at night can increase the time it takes to fall asleep to nearly twice the normal amount, the average time takes roughly 6.3 minutes but with caffeine it raises it to 12.1 minutes. Energy drinks are also a widely used form of caffeine. The caffeine in energy drinks are what is primarily responsible for the increase of energy. Each drink varies widely between 45–500 mg of caffeine. 34% of 18-24-year-olds consume energy drinks regularly. 67% of users consume energy drinks to compensate for the lack of sleep. Additionally, energy Drinks are associated with the higher risk of alcohol, drug, and stimulant usage.

Adderall 
Adderall is a drug that affects the central nervous system and is prescribed to individuals with attention deficit hyperactivity disorder (ADHD) and/or narcolepsy. This drug is commonly misused by college students as a "study drug," although research suggests that stimulants are more efficient at correcting shortfalls than enhancing performance.  Adderall is a highly abused substance among students in higher education because it prevents the reuptake of dopamine, allowing college students to stay up all day or night and remain alert. The effects of recreational use are exhaustion and an accumulation of “sleep debt.” Furthermore, frequent use of adderall during the day and night can lead to sleep deprivation and insomnia.

Alcohol 
College students who consume moderate to severe amounts of alcohol are increasingly likely to face lower quality of sleep. A study published in Behavioral Sleep Medicine showed that significant alcohol use can lead to “lower sleep duration, greater sleep schedule irregularity, bedtime delay, weekend oversleeping, and sleep-related impairment.” Furthermore, increasing alcohol consumption may lead to the student falling asleep faster, but the student will face sleep disturbance. Alcohol use decreases REM sleep, so student who consumes alcohol may sleep for the normal 7–8 hours, but the sleep quality will be lower than an individual who was sober. Additionally, consumption of alcohol can increase the chances of developing obstructive sleep apnea. Roughly 4 out 5 college students drink alcohol. 40% of men and women reported binge drinking 4-5 drinks in a row within the past 2 weeks. 11.6% of students use alcohol as a sleep aid.

Effects

Physical

Sleep cycles 
Irregular sleep schedules can cause negative impacts on learning, memory, and performance. The dual process theory determines that certain types of memory depend on specific sleep states. For example, REM and NREM (Non-Rem) sleep states. REM sleep deprivation can reduce sleep-induced improvement such as visual perception, thus influencing how one learns. REM sleep occurs every 90–120 minutes, which is roughly 4-5 times a night. REM periods of sleep increase in time with every cycle. Thus, when college students sleep less, they do not attain the last 1-2 REM cycles and in turn that affects their procedural memory.

Attention and memory 
Even if a student is staying awake in class, their ability to pay attention in class is severely diminished. 23.2% of students who don’t get enough sleep every night report that they have trouble being able to concentrate on things. Not being able to focus in class will cause the student to struggle on learning the material, which can lead to increased sleep deprivation from spending more time on homework. Lack of sleep also affects the forming of memories. Studies show REM sleep is involved in creating memories related to complex information and “students not getting enough sleep will have trouble committing their classes material to memory and learn slower”. Forgetfulness is another symptom of sleep deprivation which can be immensely harmful, especially during an exam when memory is crucial. Without adequate sleep, the neurons “can no longer function to coordinate information properly, and students lose the ability to access previously learned information." A study of graduate pharmacy students showed 81.7% of students failed to get 7 hours of sleep on the night before an examination.

Drowsiness 
Sleep deprivation causes drowsiness, which can affect students in higher education. Drowsiness can affect students in their classes and poses a risk for those who commute by car to their college campuses. Many students commute by car to their classes from their homes; at the Ohio State University, close to 30% of students commute. Individuals with less than 6 hours of sleep are the most likely to fall asleep at the wheel and with the average university students getting that amount of sleep, the dangers are a real factor for students. Once a student makes it to class, sleep deprivation will affect their ability to stay awake throughout the class. Over 50% of students have fallen asleep in class.

Eating 
Less sleep can lead to weight gain and obesity due to decreases in the body's energy expenditure and ability to stop eating once full. Combining this with the already inadequate diets of college students due to time and monetary constraints can combine to result in weight gain in college students. Weight gain in first year college students is a well known phenomenon called the "Freshman 15" in the US or the "Fresher Five" in Australia or New Zealand.

Emotional

Mental health 
Insufficient sleep affects students mood by increasing irritability and negatively affecting their emotions. Research shows that sleep deprivation increases amygdala activity which is linked to negative emotions like anger and rage. Anxiety is another symptom of sleep loss experienced by students. Lack of sleep amplifies anxiety in people who already experience increased levels of worry. A survey of college students in 2018 showed 63% of students felt “overwhelming anxiety.” Depression has also been linked to sleeplessness. In a study of 1,000 young adults those with sleep issues were four times more likely to develop depression. These symptoms are two-directional. Anxiety and depression have been shown to cause sleeplessness, meaning these symptoms can be compound.

Relationships 
The effects of sleeplessness also affect relationships among college students. An Ohio State University study showed that couples that obtained less than 7 hours of sleep interacted in a more hostile way. They also are less successful at resolving conflicts when they do come up. This is an effect from the irritability and impaired decision-making exhibited by students with sleep deprivation. Sleep deprivation also has been shown to reduce feelings of gratitude, which is an integral part of a healthy relationship.

Mood

Sleep deprivation has been found to effect mood as well. This effect is most pronounced in those that are consistently partially sleep deprived, which is the case for many college students. A meta-analysis of several studies regarding sleep deprivation suggests that the effects of partial sleep deprivation are underestimated.

Academic

GPA 
Inadequate sleep has been shown to affect student’s GPA by up to a .02 drop for every night of the week a student sleeps poorly.  Students who obtained 9 hours or more of sleep received a GPA of 3.24. Meanwhile those who had 6 hours or more of sleep received a 2.74 GPA. Among first-year university students, their GPA decreases by 0.115-0.132 for every hour that their sleep schedule is shortened. The effects of poor sleep are similar to that of binge drinking or abusive relationships on students' GPA along with their likeliness to drop one or more classes. The previously mentioned symptoms of inadequate sleep contribute to the drop in GPA. Consequences span from lack of focus to decreased motivation which leads to less hours of studying.

Students with sleep disorders are more likely to not perform well academically. Students with a GPA of 2.0 or lower were at a higher risk for sleep disorders. 30% of those who received positive results for obstructive sleep apnea were at risk for academic failure. Obstructive sleep apnea has shown to influence cognitive function in both children and adults.  Other sleep disorders also present a higher risk for academic failure: 22% of those with insomnia, 21% with restless leg syndrome/periodic limb movement disorder,  26% with circadian rhythm sleep disorder, and 21% with hypersomnia.

Social withdrawal 
Sleep deprivation may lead to social withdrawal due to increased feelings of loneliness and social isolation. Social interaction is an important part of the lives of students in higher education to remain emotionally stable.  Over 64% of students in a 2017 study surveying 48,000 college students stated that they had felt lonely in the past year. The lack of social interaction has also been linked to higher levels of anxiety and depression, which can negatively affect students. Social withdrawal also negatively affects college students’ social lives because when they feel drowsy they are less likely to seek out new experiences, which is an integral part of a student’s time in higher education.

Possible improvements

Establishing circadian rhythm 
Circadian rhythm is our bodies’ system that internally monitors and regulates sleep and waking hours in a 24 hour period. Sleeping a consistent number of hours will reduce feelings of drowsiness throughout the day, especially due to the large amount of sleep necessary for students. Going to sleep at a consistent time can also be just as important as sleeping the same number of hours each night. Students with consistent sleeping schedules had better grades on average than students with irregular sleep schedules according to a study conducted by Brigham and Women’s Hospital. Schedule changes may impact circadian rhythm, and will take time for your body to adjust to.

Most modern technology with screens emit blue light, which has the ability to impact and shift circadian rhythms by tricking the body’s response to normal changes in light.  As stated previously, exposure to blue light has the ability to suppress melatonin, a hormone that helps prepare our body for sleep. Exposure in the early evening causes a delay to release that melatonin and therefore impacts our bodies' circadian rhythm by shifting it back.

Naps 
Napping can be an emergency measure used to help improve performance in the short term as well as supplement missing hours of sleep. Naps can have several purposes, most commonly to either prevent sleepiness or recover from sleepiness when working on a task. Naps should be 60 to 90 minutes for the greatest benefits but any longer may result in affecting a person’s circadian rhythm. After napping, a person can wake with “sleep inertia” where a person feels groggy or disoriented after waking.

Naps have positive short term effects, especially in improving performance and attention. A study conducted at the University of California, Riverside showed that participants performed similarly on an exam after a 90 minute nap compared to a full eight hours of sleep. Similarly, NASA conducted a study involving its pilots, where even a minimal 30 to 40 minute nap improved pilot’s “performance by 34% and their alertness by 54%”. In another study done by Lau, Alger and Fishbein showed that students who took nap after studying were more likely to retain and recall what was learned. Both longer and short naps aided in memory retention of material.

Improving bedroom environment 
Students can improve their bedroom environments to enhance how fast they fall asleep and better their sleep quality.  Studies have shown that outside noise from traffic, students in dorms near them, or warmer temperatures within the bedroom negatively affect sleep. Another negative factor is the presence of outside light, which tricks our brain into thinking it is nearing daytime. It is possible for students to control these factors by changing the thermostat, blocking out sound, and darkening the bedroom. Harvard Medical School recommends keeping the bedroom between 60 and 75 degrees Fahrenheit, using a white noise maker or earplugs, and using heavy "black-out" curtains or an eye mask to create the ideal environment.

Sleep supplements 
Sleep supplements may also help improve sleep quality by providing the body nutrients to get a more restful sleep. Magnesium is a major mineral needed in the human body and increasing magnesium through supplements or diet can help improve sleep. Calcium supplements or diet can also help improve sleep as one of the major ingredients for the body to produce melatonin. Melatonin can also be taken directly to improve sleep; consultation with a doctor is recommended before hand though. Additionally, there have been other supplements like glycine, Valerian root, and L-theanine that may help improve sleep quality and the ability to fall asleep. Consultation from a medical professional is advised before taking any kind of sleep aid, regardless of prescription status.

References 

Students, college
Sleep deprivation